The Team technical routine competition at the 2017 World Championships was held on 16 and 18 July 2017.

Results
The preliminary round was started on 16 July at 19:00. The final was held on 18 July at 11:00.

Green denotes finalists

References

Team technical routine